Jacques Monod (21 August 1918 – 25 December 1985) was a French actor. He appeared in more than one hundred films from 1947 to 1985.

Filmography

References

External links 

1918 births
1985 deaths
French male film actors
French expatriates in Morocco